DHgate.com (simplified Chinese: 敦煌网; pinyin: Dūnhuángwǎng) is a Chinese business-to-business (B2B) and Business-to-consumer  cross-border e-commerce marketplace that facilitates the sale of manufactured products from suppliers to  small and medium retailers. It is one of the largest B2B-cross-border e-commerce trade platforms in China. The company is based in Beijing and has offices worldwide, including in the US and UK.

History

DHgate was founded by Diane Wang in Beijing in August 2004 and was officially launched in 2005. The "DH" in DHgate refers to Dunhuang (Mandarin 敦煌 (Dūnhuáng)), a Chinese city in modern-day Gansu province and formerly a strategic point on the Silk Road which linked China to the rest of the world during ancient times. The name alludes to the company's place as a modern, online version of the Silk Road linking SMEs between China and abroad. Early on, the company struggled to remain profitable, but capital investments in 2006 and 2007 helped DHGate remain afloat. In 2008, it was listed 7th on the Deloitte Technology Fast 50 for the Asia Pacific region. By the following year, it had over 1 million registered users worldwide.

In January 2013, DHgate began assisting small & medium-sized enterprises (SMEs) in Vietnam with exporting goods internationally. Prior to this, the company had primarily worked to connect Chinese SMEs with foreign buyers. DHgate also became the first Chinese cross-border e-commerce company to provide internet financial services. 

An April 2014 report by the International Finance Corporation advised Asia-Pacific Economic Cooperation (APEC) economies to follow the company's model. DHgate's founder and CEO, Diane Wang, had been a member of the APEC Business Advisory Council (ABAC) since 2011. In February 2015, access to DHgate was added to the Shopify platform.

In November 2015, DHgate helped facilitate a bilateral e-commerce treaty between Turkey and China at a ceremony during the G20 summit in Antalya that was attended by leaders of both nations and Diane Wang. The agreement was signed as a part of the Chinese government's Belt and Road Initiative. A Sino-Turkish e-commerce platform was established by DHgate (in conjunction with Chongqing Logistics City) in April 2016. 

In 2017, the company began developing physical stores called Digital Trade Centers (DTCs), which were designed to allow retailers and wholesalers to inspect products prior to purchasing them. By the end of 2017, it had set up DTCs in the United States, Hungary, Australia, Spain, Russia, Turkey, the United Arab Emirates, and Peru. In 2019, DHgate began helping Japanese SMEs sell their products through the platform, and continued its strategy in Turkey to enable suppliers in the country to sell online.

In 2022, the Office of the United States Trade Representative added DHGate to its list of Notorious Markets for Counterfeiting and Piracy.

Operations

DHgate.com is a cross-border business-to-business (B2B) e-commerce platform that links primarily Chinese SMEs to businesses and individuals worldwide. As of June 30 2020, the platform had 31 million global registered buyers, 2.2 million in sellers and other countries from over 220 countries and regions, and 32 million products available. The website sells numerous products, including a range of electronics, apparel, and health and beauty items, among many others. It is considered the largest digital platform in China that focuses exclusively on B2B transactions, and is available in 8 languages including Chinese, English, Russian, Spanish, German, Portuguese, Italian, and French.

DHgate also operates physical locations known as Digital Trade Centers (DTCs) in which prospective clients can inspect goods before ordering. DTCs are located in numerous countries globally.

In 2020, DHgate launched MyyShop, a Software-as-a-Service (SaaS) product to build a decentralized cross-border e-commerce industry. Facing the COVID-19 crisis, DHgate accelerated the digital transformation of international traders, connecting global buyers with virtual exhibitions.

References

External links 

 

Companies based in Beijing
Online retailers of China
Retail companies established in 2004
Internet properties established in 2004
Chinese companies established in 2004
Notorious markets